Küre can refer to:

 Küre, Alaca
 Küre, Kastamonu